Embryoglossa aethiopicalis is a species of snout moth in the genus Embryoglossa. It was described by Max Gaede in 1916 and is known from Nigeria.

References

Moths described in 1916
Pyralinae